The Tutakoke River is a small coastal river in the Yukon-Kuskokwim Delta. The river is located near Hooper Bay, Alaska, within the Kusilvak Census Area.

See also 
 List of Alaska rivers

References 

Rivers of Alaska
Rivers of Kusilvak Census Area, Alaska
Rivers of Unorganized Borough, Alaska